Star Search 2003 is the 8th installment of Star Search. From March 2003, auditions started in three countries, Singapore, Malaysia and China to search for Chinese language-speaking acting talent. Selected contestants are provided training for a final selection in each country. Each of the 3 countries selects 4 Star Search contestants (2 male, 2 female) to compete at the Grand Finals on June 29 in Singapore.

Contestants information

Format
During the 3-hour power-packed competition, the 12 finalists competed in the areas of star appeal, acting, singing and dancing, and hosting.

But what’s different this year is that viewers will have a hand in deciding the winner too. They can vote for the best contestant via SMS, contributing the remaining 10% of the total score.

Judges

Judging criteria

Star Appeal - 50%
Markers include beauty/good looks, audience appeal, charisma, outstanding personality, confidence level

Talent & Performance - 50%
Markers include Acting, Drama, Comedy, Stage, Singing/Dancing and Hosting abilities

Awards and prizes

Imaging Segment
Get ready for a colourful night of drama, song and dance as finalists don and take on a potpourri of characters such as White and Green Snake in period drama Madam White Snake, characters from the musical Chang & Eng and the characters of Anna and the King in The King And I.

Round : Hosting segment

Round : Acting segment
Perhaps the greatest challenge for the finalists lie in the acting segment where they will portray various characters from our local productions which have made an indelible impression.

Scene 1: Mysterious Client 神秘大客户
Guest starring: Chew Chor Meng as Ah Bee from Don't Worry Be Happy & Lobang King, and Hong Huifang as Pan Jinglian from Viva Le Famille and A Toast of Love

Scene 2: My Sassy Customer 我的野蛮顾客
Guest starring: Huang Wenyong as Huang Jinlai from Don't Worry Be Happy & Lobang King, and Li Nanxing as Ah Bao from The Vagrant

Round : Singing segment
In conjunction with celebrations for MediaCorp TV’S 40th anniversary, the 12 finalists will also regale us with famous songs from the 4 decades.

See also
Star Search 2007
Star Search Singapore

External links
Mediacorp Channel 8 Website
Star Search 2003 - Official Website (archive)

2003 Singaporean television seasons